This is a list of video and pre-video (electro-mechanical) quiz arcade games. All are coin-operated arcade machines.

External links 
arcade-history database
Killer List of Videogames

Quiz arcade